This is a partial list of universities and colleges in the Republic of Malta. Tertiary education in Malta is divided into public and private universities as well as vocational schools. Private universities include locally established universities and campuses of foreign universities. Since January 2021, the overview of licensed institutions and accredited course, previously offered by NCFHE (National Commission for Further and Higher Education), is offered and maintained by MFHEA (Malta Further & Higher Education Authority).

Public university 
University of Malta, Msida

Private universities 
American University of Malta, Cospicua
Barts and the London School of Medicine and Dentistry, Victoria 
European Graduate School, Valletta
Global College Malta, SmartCity,Kalkara
Middlesex University Malta, Pembroke (Middlesex University will be closing its Malta Campus in September 2022).
Triagon Academy, Valletta
SMC Business School, Birkirkara, Malta

Higher education institutes (HEI) 

College of Remote and Offshore Medicine (CoROM)
EDU International Institute of Higher Education, Kalkara
GBSB Global Business School, Birkirkara
Institute of Tourism Studies (ITS), Luqa and Qala
London School of Commerce, Floriana
Malta College of Arts, Science and Technology, Paola
Malta Institute of Taxation, Attard
Pegaso International HEI (in cooperation with Università degli Studi Pegaso, Naples, Italy), Kalkara
St. Martin's Institute of Higher Education, Hamrun
Zerah Business School Floriana

References 

 
Malta
Malta
Universities